Lorin Edwin Helm (August 15, 1920 – May 4, 1945) was an American football coach. He served as the head football coach at Sterling College in Sterling, Kansas for one season, in 1942, compiling a record of 0–8.

Head coaching record

References

External links
 

1920 births
1945 deaths
Sterling Warriors football coaches
People from Reno County, Kansas
United States Army Air Forces personnel of World War II